This is a list of the mammal species recorded in Thailand.

Order: Artiodactyla (even-toed ungulates & cetaceans)

Order: Carnivora (carnivorans)

Order: Chiroptera (bats)

Order: Dermoptera (colugos)

Order: Eulipotyphla (Hedgehogs, shrews, moles and relatives)

Order: Lagomorpha (lagomorphs)

Order: Perissodactyla (odd-toed ungulates)

Order: Pholidota (pangolins)

Order: Primates

Order: Proboscidea (elephants)

Order: Rodentia (rodents)

Order: Scandentia (treeshrews)

Order: Sirenia (manatees and dugongs)

See also
List of species native to Thailand
Animal welfare in Thailand

References

External links

.List
Mammals
Thailand
 Thailand
Thailand